The United States Navy Memorial presents a Lone Sailor Award to Sea Service veterans who have excelled with distinction in their respective careers during or after their service. The award recipients will join a list of men and women who have distinguished themselves by drawing upon their military experience to become successful in their subsequent careers and lives, while exemplifying the core values of Honor, Courage and Commitment. The Lone Sailor Award has been given out each year since the Navy Memorial was dedicated in 1987.

The Lone Sailor Awards Dinner is an annual gala hosted by the Navy Memorial to Honor, Recognize and Celebrate its constituents and award recipients. 

The ceremony is held in September of each year at the National Building Museum in Washington, D.C. 

The United States Navy Memorial also issues a corresponding award known as the Naval Heritage Award, issued to those who were not veterans of Sea Services, but have done outstanding work to support the Sea Services and displayed the same values of Lone Sailor Award recipients in their lives.

Lone Sailor Award honorees
(An * denotes a posthumous recipient)

2022 
 James Rex Barker
 Admiral Thomas “Tom” B. Fargo

2021 
 Drew Carey
 U.S. Senate Chaplain Barry Black

2020 
 Bill Withers
 James Mattis

2019 
 Dr Jack London
 Paul Galanti

2018 
 Harvey Barnum, Jr.
 William Hannigan
 Robert E. Naser*

2017 
 Christopher Gardner
 Delbert* & Ima Black
 David Robinson

2016 
Daniel D’Aniello
Senator John H. Glenn, Jr.
Rear Admiral Robert H. Shumaker
John P. Cosgrove

2015
Admiral James S. Gracey  
J. William Middendorf II
Robert S. Morrison
C. Michael Petters

2014
Honorable Samuel A. Nunn, Jr.
James A. Skinner
Robert J. Stevens

2013
Daniel Akerson
General Paul X. Kelley 
Ted Turner

2012
Everett Alvarez, Jr. 
John Paul DeJoria 
J. David Power III
Mark Russell

2011
Lloyd V. "Beau" Bridges III
Jeffrey L. Bridges 
Lloyd V. Bridges, Jr.*
Gerald F. "Jerry" Coleman
Robert W.A. Feller* 
Brian P. Lamb

2010
Lanier W. Phillips 
Edward W. Lebaron, Jr.

2009
Lawrence P. "Yogi" Berra 
Leonard A. Lauder 
Frederick W. Smith

2008
A.G. Lafley
John H. McConnell*
Arnold Palmer

2007
Tom Benson 
Morgan L. Fitch, Jr., Esq. 
Stan Musial
Senator John W. Warner, Jr.

2006
Admiral William J. Crowe, Jr. 
Arnold "Red" Auerbach

2005
Rear Admiral Grace Hopper*
Senator John McCain

2004
Benjamin Bradlee
Admiral Stansfield Turner

2003
Captain Dan A. Carmichael 
Joseph F. Cullman, III
Captain James A. Lovell, Jr.

2002
Gordon M. Bethune 
Honorable Donald H. Rumsfeld
Representative Floyd D. Spence*
Representative Bob Stump

2000
Nickolas Davatzes 
Robert M. Morgenthau
President Theodore Roosevelt*
John C. Whitehead

1999
Charles Francis Adams IV*
Captain Thomas J. Hudner, Jr. 
President John F. Kennedy*
Senator John F. Kerry

1998
Eddie Albert 
Ambassador John Gavin
Admiral Hyman G. Rickover*
Esther L. Snyder

1997
Ernest Borgnine
Captain Winifred Quick Collins 
Senator Robert Kerrey
Austin H. Kiplinger 
Edmund W. Littlefield 
Henry Trione
Jonathan Winters

1996
Dr. Robert Ballard 
Roger T. Staubach 
Dr. Kathryn Sullivan

1995
President Richard M. Nixon*

1994
Tony Curtis 
Senator Daniel Patrick Moynihan
Admiral E.R. Zumwalt, Jr.

1993
James A. Michener
Allen E. Murray 
Harold A. Poling 
Rear Admiral William Thompson

1992
President Gerald R. Ford
Honorable H. Lawrence Garrett, III

1991 
Admiral Arleigh Burke
President George H. W. Bush
Justice William S. White

1989
Admiral Thomas H. Moorer

1987
Herman Wouk

Naval Heritage Award honorees

2022
Christine H. Fox

2016
Peter Ho
Martin A. Kropelnicki

2013
Senator Kay Bailey Hutchison

2008
Representative Norm Dicks

2006 
Senator Daniel Inouye

2005 
Representative Ike Skelton

2002 
Clive Cussler

1998 
President Ronald W. Reagan
John Wayne

1997 
Zachary and Elizabeth Fisher
Ambassador Paul H. Nitze

1996
Bob Hope

1995 
Senator Margaret Chase Smith

References

Awards and decorations of the United States Navy